The Department of New England was a Union Army Department created on October 1, 1861, consisting of the six New England States.  The department was discontinued on February 20, 1862.

Commanders
 Major General, Benjamin F. Butler,  October 1, 1861 - February 20, 1862

Posts in Department of New England 
Fort Adams, Rhode Island

Notes

References
  National Archives, Guide to Federal Records; Records of United States Army Continental Commands, 1821-1920 (Record Group 393), 1817-1940 (bulk 1817-1920)

Union Army departments